The following are the national records in track and field in the United States Virgin Islands maintained by the Virgin Islands Track & Field Federation (VITFF).

Outdoor

Key to tables:

h = hand timing

A = affected by altitude

OT = oversized track (> 200m in circumference)

y = denotes one mile

Men

Women

Indoor

Men

Women

Notes

References
General
US Virgin Islands Outdoor Records 14 July 2019 updated
World Athletics Statistic Handbook 2018: National Indoor Records
Specific

External links
VITFF web site

United States Virgin Islands
records
Athletics
Athletics